Thames was launched in 1794 in London. The French captured her in late 1795, but the British Royal Navy recaptured her within weeks. She then disappeared from the Registers for some years. She reappeared as Thames in 1800, sailing as a West Indiaman. In 1802 new owners sailed her as a slave ship. She made one full voyage as a slave ship. French privateers captured her in 1805 after she had gathered slaves in West Africa but before she could deliver them to a port in the British Caribbean.

Career
Thames first appeared in Lloyd's Register (LR) in 1794.

Between 21 and 30 September 1795, a squadron of French frigates captured several British merchantmen, Thames, Atterberry, master, among them. Shortly thereafter,  recaptured Thames, Atterbury, master.

Thames then disappeared from LR and the Register of Shipping for some years. She reappeared in 1800. 

1st slave voyage (1802–1804): Captain James Welsh sailed from London on 6 December 1802. Thames gathered her slaves at the Sierra Leone estuary and arrived at Kingston on 2 December 1803 with 341 slaves. Welsh had received a letter of marque on 17 November. Thames left Kingston on 12 April 1804 and arrived back in London 28 May. 

2nd slave voyage (1805): Captain Welsh sailed from London on 18 February 1805, bound for Africa.

Fate
Two French schooners captured Thames, Welch, master, in late 1805 off Surinam. They took her into Guadeloupe.

Citations

1794 ships
Age of Sail merchant ships of England
Captured ships
London slave ships